Azerbaijan is set to participate in the Eurovision Song Contest 2023 in Liverpool, United Kingdom, having internally selected TuralTuranX to represent the country with the song "Tell Me More".

Background 

Azerbaijan had won the contest on one occasion in 2011 with the song "Running Scared" performed by Ell and Nikki. Since their debut in 2008, Azerbaijan has had a string of successful results, qualifying to the final and placing in the top ten each year until 2014, including a third-place result in 2009 with the song "Always" performed by AySel and Arash and a second-place result in 2013 with the song "Hold Me" performed by Farid Mammadov. However, in 2018, Azerbaijan placed eleventh in the semi-final with the song "X My Heart" performed by Aisel, making it the first occasion that Azerbaijan did not participate in a Eurovision final since their debut in 2008. In 2019, Chingiz with "Truth" brought Azerbaijan back into the top 10, finishing in 8th place with 302 points. In 2022, Nadir Rustamli with the song "Fade to Black" placed 16th with 106 points.

Before Eurovision

Internal selection 
The Azerbaijani entry for the 2023 contest will be internally selected by İctimai Television. The broadcaster opened a song submission period from 8 to 31 December 2022 for interested composers to enter their songs. The submission period was later extended until 15 January 2023. İTV later revealed that over 200 potential songs were submitted, with the majority coming from international songwriters outside of Azerbaijan. Vasif Mammadov, head of the Azerbaijani delegation, stated that the broadcaster was aiming to showcase Azerbaijani composers at the 2023 contest. 

On 1 February 2023, İTV denied allegations that they had already selected their Eurovision artist after accusations from singer Rauf Kingsley that the broadcaster had already selected the group Mamagama due to links with Eldar Gasimov, who is working with the Azerbaijani delegation. The broadcaster stated that five artists were left in the running to represent Azerbaijan, with the shortlisted artists revealed on 2 February 2023. On 12 February 2023, it was revealed that the entry would be produced in Azerbaijan for the first time since 2008. The final entry was determined via the decision of a focus group appointed by İTV.

TuralTuranX were announced as the chosen entrants on 9 March 2023. Their competing song, "Tell Me More", was released on 13 March.

At Eurovision 
According to Eurovision rules, all nations with the exceptions of the host country and the "Big Five" (France, Germany, Italy, Spain and the United Kingdom) are required to qualify from one of two semi-finals in order to compete for the final; the top ten countries from each semi-final progress to the final. The European Broadcasting Union (EBU) split up the competing countries into six different pots based on voting patterns from previous contests, with countries with favourable voting histories put into the same pot. On 31 January 2023, an allocation draw was held, which placed each country into one of the two semi-finals, and determined which half of the show they would perform in. Azerbaijan has been placed into the first semi-final, to be held on 9 May 2023, and has been scheduled to perform in the second half of the show.

References 

2023
Countries in the Eurovision Song Contest 2023
Eurovision